Johanna Konta is a British former professional tennis player who was ranked as high as No. 4 in the world. She won four singles titles on the WTA Tour, as well as eleven singles and four doubles titles on the ITF Circuit in her career. Below is a list of her career achievements and titles won.

Performance timelines

Only main-draw results in WTA Tour, Grand Slam tournaments, Fed Cup/Billie Jean King Cup and Olympic Games are included in win–loss records.

Singles

Doubles

Significant finals

Premier Mandatory & Premier 5

Singles: 3 (1 title, 2 runner-ups)

WTA career finals

Singles: 9 (4 titles, 5 runner-ups)

ITF Circuit finals

Singles: 14 (11 titles, 3 runner-ups)

Doubles: 7 (4 titles, 3 runner-ups)

Fed Cup participation

Singles

Doubles

WTA Tour career earnings

Career Grand Slam statistics

Grand Slam seedings
The tournaments won by Konta are in boldface, and advanced into finals by Konta are in italics.

Best Grand Slam tournament results details

Head-to-head record

Record against top 10 players
Konta's record against players who have been ranked in the top 10. Active players are in boldface:

No. 1 wins

Top 10 wins

Notes

References

External links
 
 
 

Tennis career statistics